Stages of development may refer to:

Biology 

Developmental biology, the study of the process by which animals and plants grow and develop
Prenatal development, also called fetal development, or embryology
Human development (biology), the process of growing to maturity. In biological terms, this entails growth from a one-celled zygote to an adult human being

Economics
Economic growth, the increase in the amount of the goods and services produced by an economy over time
Input-output model, a quantitative economic technique that represents the interdependencies between different branches of a national economy or different regional economies
IS/LM model, a macroeconomic tool that demonstrates the relationship between interest rates and real output in the goods and services market and the money market
Rostovian take-off model
Exogenous growth model
Endogenous growth theory, holds that economic growth is primarily the result of endogenous and not external forces
Dual-sector model, a model in developmental economics
O-Ring theory of economic development, a model of economic development put forward by Michael Kremer, which proposes that tasks of production must be executed proficiently together in order for any of them to be of high value
Harrod–Domar model, used in development economics to explain an economy's growth rate in terms of the level of saving and productivity of capital
Kerala model, of development, based on the development experience of the southern Indian state of Kerala, refers to the state's achievement of significant improvements in material conditions of living, reflected in indicators of social development that are comparable to that of many developed countries, even though the state's per capita income is low in comparison to them
Harris–Todaro model, named after John R
Romer Model

Psychology
Developmental stage theories / Child development stages – stages of child development
 Erikson's stages of psychosocial development, as articulated by Erik Erikson, explain eight stages through which a healthily developing human should pass from infancy to late adulthood
 Kohlberg's stages of moral development
 Loevinger's stages of ego development, 'conceptualize a theory of ego development that was based on Erikson's psychosocial model', as well as on the works of Harry Stack Sullivan, and in which 'the ego was theorized to mature and evolve through stages across the lifespan as a result of a dynamic interaction between the inner self and the outer environment'
 Piaget's theory of cognitive development, a comprehensive theory about the nature and development of human intelligence, first developed by Jean Piaget
 Neo-Piagetian theories of cognitive development, theory of cognitive development has been criticized on many grounds
 Psychosexual development, a central element of the psychoanalytic sexual drive theory, that human beings, from birth, possess an instinctual libido (sexual energy) that develops in five stages
 Model of hierarchical complexity, a framework for scoring how complex a behavior is
 Maslow's hierarchy of needs, a theory in psychology proposed by Abraham Maslow in his 1943 paper "A Theory of Human Motivation"

Sociology
Sociocultural evolution (cultural development), and social evolution, describing how cultures and societies have changed over time
Fowler's stages of faith development, proposed by Professor James W
Team development
Tuckman's stages of group development (forming, storming, norming and performing), model of group development was first proposed by Bruce Tuckman in 1965, who maintained that these phases are all necessary and inevitable in order for the team to grow, to face up to challenges, to tackle problems, to find solutions, to plan work, and to deliver results

Technology 
Software release life cycle, software development stages